Damson Brook is a small river in Wiltshire, United Kingdom. It rises in the civil parish of Bulford, just north of Bulford Camp. After two miles it joins Nine Mile River in the civil parish of Milston, which in turn flows into the River Avon.

According to local legend, Guinevere had her baby son baptised in this brook.

Damson